Boyd Vincent Cherry (March 6, 1893 – November 14, 1970) was an American football and basketball player.  He played college football and basketball at Ohio State University. In 1914 he became the first Ohio State Buckeyes football player to receive All-American honors and the first to receive first-team all-conference honors. After graduating from Ohio State in 1915, he was employed for more than 25 years by the Kinnear Manufacturing Company in Columbus, Ohio. He was born in Newark, Ohio, in 1893, and he died in 1970 at age 77 in Fort Myers, Florida.

References

1893 births
1970 deaths
Ohio State Buckeyes football players
Ohio State Buckeyes men's basketball players
American football ends
Sportspeople from Newark, Ohio
Players of American football from Ohio
American men's basketball players